The Movimiento Nacional de Trabajadores Para La Liberación (MONTRAL) is a national trade union center in Venezuela. It was formed in 1974 and is affiliated to the International Trade Union Confederation.

References

Trade unions in Venezuela
International Trade Union Confederation
Trade unions established in 1974
1974 establishments in Venezuela